Ruxandra Lupu (1630–1686) was a Romanian princess. 

She was born to Vasile Lupu. She married Tymofiy Khmelnytsky.

References 

 Marcu, George (coord.) - Dicționarul personalităților feminine din România, Editura Meronia, Bucharest, 2009.

1630 births
1686 deaths
17th-century Romanian women
17th-century Ukrainian people